Nativity of the Virgin may refer to:

Nativity of Mary, birthday of the Blessed Virgin Mary

Paintings
Nativity of the Virgin (Altdorfer), c. 1520
Nativity of the Virgin (Beccafumi), c. 1540–1543
Nativity of the Virgin (del Sarto), 1513–1514
Nativity of the Virgin (Francesco Albani), c. 1598
Nativity of the Virgin (Master of the Osservanza Triptych), c. 1430–1433
Nativity of the Virgin (Perugino), c. 1472
Nativity of the Virgin (Pietro Lorenzetti), c. 1335–1342
Nativity of the Virgin (Upper Rhenish Master), c. 1430